Litultovice is a market town in Opava District in the Moravian-Silesian Region of the Czech Republic. It has about 900 inhabitants.

Etymology
The name is derived from an old personal name Litult, Lutult, or Litolt. It was the founder of the village.

History
The first written mention of Litultovice is from 1289. It was a part of the Moravian enclaves in Silesia owned by the bishops of Olomouc, who gave it to various nobles as a fief. A small fortress in the village was first mentioned in 1446.

The most significant holders of the village were the Běrka of Násilé family (1451–1516), the Stoš of Kounice family (1516–1567) and the Bítovský of Bítov family (1580–1614). In 1582, Litultovice was destroyed by a fire and only the fortress survived. The fortress was replaced by a new castle in 1609. In 1792, Litultovice was bought from the Olomouc bishops by the Putz of Rolsberg family.

References

External links

Market towns in the Czech Republic
Populated places in Opava District